Cairncross Parish  is a bounded rural locality of Mid-Coast Council New South Wales and a civil parish of Macquarie County on the Mid North Coast.

References 

Mid North Coast
Towns in New South Wales